Route 245 is a short two-lane highway in southwest Missouri.  Its northern terminus is at Route 32 about three miles (5 km) west of Fair Play; its southern terminus is at U.S. Route 160 about seven miles (11 km) east of Greenfield.

Route description
Throughout the entire route, Route 245 is a two-lane undivided highway. It begins at an intersection with US 160 about seven miles west of Greenfield. After 1 mile (1.6 km), the road comes to a junction with Route U, which runs east towards Walnut Grove. Heading north, it passes through Dadeville, where it intersects Route W, before reaching an intersection with Route 215 in Bona. The road continues to head north, where it passes over Stockton Lake. Finally, the road terminates at Route 32, about 3 miles (5 km) west of Fair Play.

Major intersections

References 

245
Transportation in Dade County, Missouri
Transportation in Cedar County, Missouri